Peugeot Sport is the department of French carmaker Peugeot responsible for motorsport activities.

History

Beginnings in rallying

Peugeot Sport was formed in 1981 under the name of Peugeot Talbot Sport, after Jean Todt, a World Rally Championship co-driver for Talbot driver Guy Fréquelin, was asked by Peugeot to create a sporting department for the PSA Peugeot Citroën group. The rally team, established at 8, rue Paul Bert, Boulogne-Billancourt (the racing team will leave those premises in July 1990 to go to Vélizy) near Paris, debuted its Group B Peugeot 205 Turbo 16 in the 1984 season, and took its first victory in Rally Finland in the hands of Ari Vatanen. In the 1985 season, Peugeot drivers Vatanen and Timo Salonen won seven out of the 12 rounds to give Peugeot its first manufacturers' title and Salonen the drivers' title. Vatanen had been seriously injured in an accident in Argentina in 1985, so was replaced by Juha Kankkunen for the 1986 season, who promptly delivered the team the second consecutive title. The FIA banned Group B cars for the 1987 season after the fatal accident of Henri Toivonen. This lead Peugeot to switch to rally raid, using the 205 to win the Dakar Rally for two consecutive years in 1987 to 1988, and then used the 405 to win in 1989 and 1990. Peugeot Talbot Sport also participated three times at the Pikes Peak Hillclimb Race in 1987, 1988 and 1989, winning the last two years, as well as in 2013 with the 208 T16.

Move to sportscars
In endurance racing Peugeot Talbot Sport established their sportscar team at Vélizy-Villacoublay, France  and in November 1988 launched the Peugeot 905 project, to develop a sportscar to begin competing in the World Sportscar Championship in the 1991 season. The 905 made its racing debut in the final two races of the 1990 season, and finished second in the 1991 season. In the 1992 season, Peugeot Talbot Sport won the 24 Hours of Le Mans, with drivers Derek Warwick, Yannick Dalmas and Mark Blundell. They also won the 1992 World Sportscar Championship, thanks to Warwick, Dalmas, Philippe Alliot and Mauro Baldi. The championship did not run in 1993, but Peugeot were able to take a 1–2–3 finish at the 1993 24 Hours of Le Mans, with Éric Hélary, Christophe Bouchut and Geoff Brabham driving the winning car. Peugeot Talbot Sport subsequently pulled out of sportscar racing. Jean Todt, meanwhile, left Peugeot for Scuderia Ferrari.

Formula One
This was developed to be used by McLaren in 1994. However, poor reliability led to the relationship ending at the end of 1994 after 8 podiums, zero victories and 17 DNF's, it was revealed that the main reason for the relationship collapsing was because Peugeot actually did not provide the factory support that was promised which was why Mclaren signed up with Peugeot in the first place over Chrysler-Lamborghini due to the promise of Factory Support and Further Engine Development to maintain competitiveness, Peugeot however did not further develop the engine to help Mclaren become more competitive over the course of the season and thus McLaren elected to switch to works Ilmor-built Mercedes-Benz High Performance Engines with guaranteed factory support from Mercedes directly and in effect becoming their new works team from the  season onwards. It was established just a few days before the partnership was made official that Peugeot had changed the terms of their agreement with Prost meaning they had to pay Peugeot for the engines over a period of 3 Seasons rather than receiving them for free over a period of 5 Seasons, this left Prost with little to no choice but to agree to the new terms as it would have left them with little to no time to either find a new engine supplier or returning to Mugen-Honda which was not possible as they had already reached an agreement to supply Jordan, however also not doing so would have had major ramifications with potential sponsors pulling out of sponsoring them , the relationship was a disaster, in 1998 a measly 1 point was scored over the entire season in Belgium courtesy of Jarno Trulli which was a stark contrast to the 33 points Peugeot had scored with Jordan in 1997, 1999 was only a slight improvement with 9 points scored though a final podium was achieved for Peugeot at the 1999 European Grand Prix courtesy of Trulli finishing 2nd, However, after a pointless 2000 season where poor reliability matched with Prost's inability to deliver a competitive chassis combined with having scored no wins since their debut as an engine supplier in 1994, led to the French marque pulling the plug out of F1 after 115 Grand Prix entries with just 14 podiums scored.

The Peugeot engines were bought by an Asian consortium led by former F1 designer Enrique Scalabroni called Asiatech and used for two further years (in 2001 for Arrows and in 2002 for Minardi. The former named Peugeot engine's best result during this time was at the 2002 Australian Grand Prix when Mark Webber managed an incredible 5th place on his debut, this unexpected success meant the team were allowed an exception to celebrate on the Podium Step. The Asiatech engines were both reliable, powerful and were supplied at zero cost, but its poor driveability led to both teams replacing them in favor of more costly but more capable Cosworth units.

Touring car racing

Peugeot entered the British Touring Car Championship in 1992, preparing 405's for former champion Robb Gravett. The team was run in-house from the company's UK factory in Coventry. The 405 never won a race despite promising results in its four seasons of competition, before being replaced in 1996 by the 406. Unfortunately Peugeot UK did not share any technical data with its European contemporaries, and the BTCC programme suffered. Peugeot handed the works deal to Motor Sport Developments for 1997 and 98, but wins still eluded the team. With spiralling costs in the series, Peugeot withdrew from the BTCC at the end of 1998.

With his Peugeot 406, Laurent Aïello won the 1997 Super Tourenwagen Cup season.

The Peugeot 306 GTi won the prestigious Spa 24 hours endurance race in 1999 and 2000.

Peugeot won five times the Danish Touringcar Championship, with both the Peugeot 306 -winner in 1999, 2000 and 2001– and the Peugeot 307 winner in 2002 and 2003.

Peugeot has been racing successfully in the Asian Touring Car Series, winning the 2000, 2001, and 2002 championships with the Peugeot 306 GTi.

In 2001, Peugeot entered three 406 Coupés into the British Touring Car Championship to compete with the dominant Vauxhall Astra Coupés. However, the 406 Coupé was not competitive, despite some promise towards the end of the year, notably when Peugeot's Steve Soper led a race only to suffer engine failure in the last few laps. The 406 Coupés were retired at the end of the following year and replaced with the 307—again, uncompetitively—in 2003.

Peugeot has been racing successfully in the Stock Car Brasil series since 2007 and won the 2008, 2009, and 2011 championships. Peugeot Argentina has participated in TC 2000/Super TC 2000, where it has also won championships.

In 2013, the Peugeot 208GTi won a one-two-three at the 24 Hours Nürburgring endurance race.

Return to rallying

In 1999, Peugeot Sport returned to the World Rally Championship with the Peugeot 206 WRC, under the guidance of director Corrado Provera. The car debuted at the Tour de Corse, with François Delecour driving one car and Gilles Panizzi and Marcus Grönholm sharing the second car over the remaining events. Grönholm finished fourth on the car's third event, Rally Finland, before Panizzi finished second on Rallye Sanremo.

In 2000, Grönholm gave the car its first victory at Rally Sweden, and followed this up with wins in New Zealand, Finland and Australia on his way to the Drivers’ championship. Panizzi won in Corsica and Sanremo, giving Peugeot the Manufacturers’ championship.

In 2001, Didier Auriol joined the team, replacing Delecour as the main driver alongside Grönholm.  Panizzi and Harri Rovanperä also drove additional cars for the team on selected events. Rovanperä won round two in Sweden, as Grönholm struggled with retirements during the first half of the year. Auriol won in Spain, Grönholm won in Finland, Australia and Great Britain, and Panizzi won in Italy. The team retained their manufacturers’ crown, even though Grönholm was the best placed driver in the drivers’ standings, in fourth place. Rovanperä was fifth, Auriol eighth and Panizzi ninth.

For 2002, the team signed Richard Burns, the 2001 champion, from Subaru, replacing Auriol in the team. Grönholm won round two in Sweden, before Panizzi took back-to-back wins in France and Spain. Grönholm won the next event in Cyprus, before he and Burns were disqualified for a technical infringement in Argentina. Grönholm won again in Finland, while Panizzi won his third event of the year in Italy. Grönholm completed back-to-back victories in New Zealand and Australia to take his second drivers’ title. Burns finished the season fifth, ahead of Panizzi and Rovanperä in sixth and seventh. Peugeot were able to take a third consecutive Manufacturers’ title.

The driver lineup remained the same for 2003, with Marlboro joining as title sponsor. Grönholm won in Sweden yet again, and took another two wins in New Zealand and Argentina. Panizzi picked up another win in Spain. Poised to rejoin Subaru in 2004, Burns was ruled out of action ahead of the final round of the season in Great Britain, having suffered a blackout while driving to the event. He was replaced for the event and the 2004 season by Belgian Freddy Loix. Burns finished the season fourth in the standings, ahead of Grönholm in sixth. Peugeot lost its manufacturers crown to Citroën.

Peugeot introduced a new car for the 2004 season, the 307 WRC, which was based upon the coupé cabriolet version of the 307 road car. Having originally not been part of the team at the start of the season, Rovanperä replaced Loix after two rounds in the team's second car alongside Grönholm, who struggled with the new car initially. He took the team's only victory of the season in Finland, and he finished fifth in the standings at the end of the season. Peugeot finished fourth in the manufacturers’ standings.

For 2005, Peugeot signed Markko Märtin from Ford to partner Grönholm. Once again, it took until Grönholm won Rally Finland yet again in August for the team to win. Two rallies later, in Great Britain, Märtin's co-driver Michael Park was killed after the pair's 307 WRC left the road. Märtin subsequently pulled out of the World Rally Championship. Daniel Carlsson and Nicolas Bernardi both filled in for him during the final four events. Grönholm took a second win of the season in Japan, on his way to third in the standings. Peugeot finished second in the manufacturers’ standings. At the end of 2005, PSA Peugeot Citroën withdrew its two teams from the WRC. Citroën took a year out to develop a new car and returned in 2007, but Peugeot did not return to the WRC.

Peugeot Sport created the Peugeot 207 S2000, a rally car built to Super 2000 regulations. Peugeot Sport enter the cars, run by Kronos Racing, in the Intercontinental Rally Challenge (IRC). Peugeot drivers Enrique García-Ojeda, Nicolas Vouilloz and Kris Meeke won the IRC drivers' title in 2007, 2008 and 2009 respectively. It was replaced by 208 T16, which competes under R5 Regulations.

Return to sportscars

Under the guidance of new director Michel Barge, Peugeot Sport returned to sportscar racing for 2007, taking on the dominant Audi with the Peugeot 908 HDi FAP. The car made its debut at the 2007 1000km of Monza, the opening round of the 2007 Le Mans Series season. The pairing of Marc Gené and Nicolas Minassian took the car to victory. At the 2007 24 Hours of Le Mans, Stéphane Sarrazin took pole position for the team ahead of the Audis. In the race, the #8 car of Sarrazin, Pedro Lamy and Sébastien Bourdais finished second behind the #1 Audi. After Le Mans, Sarrazin and Lamy took the Le Mans Series title for Peugeot.

At the 2008 24 Hours of Le Mans, Peugeot and Sarrazin once again took pole position, locking out the first three places on the grid. In the race, the trio of cars finished in second, third and fifth. In the Le Mans Series, Peugeot lost out to Audi again, Minassian and Gené finishing in second place.

At the beginning of 2009, PSA Peugeot Citroën made Citroën Sport director Olivier Quesnel the director of Peugeot Sport too. At the 2009 24 Hours of Le Mans, Sarrazin set his third consecutive pole position for the team. In the race, the team delivered its first Le Mans victory since 1993, with the trio of David Brabham, Gené and Alexander Wurz winning ahead of the car driven by Franck Montagny, Bourdais and Sarrazin. The team's third car finished the race in sixth position. The team only contested one round of the Le Mans Series season, at Spa as preparation for Le Mans itself.

Peugeot scored a 1–2 finish at the 2010 12 Hours of Sebring. However, reliability problems for the 908 at the 2010 24 Hours of Le Mans meant that Audi finished 1–2–3 at the race.

At the 2011 12 Hours of Sebring, the older Peugeot 908 HDi FAP owned by Oreca Racing had a surprise win over the factory 908s and Audi R15++s. At the 2011 24 Hours of Le Mans, Peugeot saw itself in a position to win after two of the Audi R18s crashed; only a strong effort from Audi kept Peugeot from winning the race. The winning Audi was only 13 seconds ahead of the second-place Peugeot 908.

On 18 January 2012 Peugeot Sport announced its withdrawal from sportscar racing, citing lowering car sales and the economic downturn as reasons. A return, however, was not ruled out if funds can be procured for the future, but not likely before 2015.

On 13 November 2019 Peugeot announced that they will take part in the 2022 WEC season in the newly created "Hypercar" class, which makes the brand's return to the sports car racing landscape after an 11-year absence. During the 2020 24 Hours of Le Mans, the CEO of PSA Group Carlos Tavares unveiled renders of the new Peugoet Hypercar, and in December 2020 Peugeot and Total unveiled the powertrain called the Peugeot Hybrid4 (this platform was born in 2012 with the unveil of the 2012 hybrid-spec of the Peugeot 908), with aerodynamics completed in partnership with Ligier. On 8 February 2021 Peugeot revealed a driver line-up consisting of Loic Duval, Jean-Éric Vergne, Mikkel Jensen, Gustavo Menezes, Paul Di Resta, and Kevin Magnussen, as well as James Rossiter as simulator/reserve driver for the WEC 2022 season. Rossiter was later promoted to full-time driver after Magnussen was announced to be driving for the Haas F1 Team in 2022, thus leaving him unavailable for WEC.

Return to Pikes Peak Hillclimb Race

After Ari Vatanen and Bobby Unser, in the late 1980s, won the Pikes Peak Hillclimb Race, Peugeot Sport and Sébastien Loeb decided to unite their respective strengths and go for it.

In April 2013, a 208 T16 was tested by Sébastien Loeb at Mont Ventoux. Loosely based on the shape and design of the production 208, the T16 is a lightweight  vehicle that uses the rear wing from the Peugeot 908, and has a 3.2-litre, twin-turbo V6 engine, developing  with the aim of competing at the Pikes Peak International Hill Climb. On 30 June 2013 this car demolished the standing record on Pikes Peak by over a minute and a half, with an overall time of 8:13.878.

Detailed results

Formula One (1994–2000) 
(key)

World Sportscar Championship (1991–1992)